AC Sparta Prague is an association football club from Prague, Czech Republic. The team has participated in 38 seasons of Union of European Football Associations (UEFA) club competitions, including 24 seasons in the Champions League and its predecessors, 14 seasons in the UEFA Cup and Europa League and six seasons in the Cup Winners' Cup. The club's first appearance was in the 1964–65 European Cup Winners' Cup. The club's best performance is reaching the semi-finals of the Cup Winners' Cup, which they managed in the 1972–73 season.

The club plays its home matches at Generali Arena, an all-seater stadium in Prague. Jiří Novotný has appeared in the most UEFA matches for Sparta, with 83 games to his name. The scoring record is shared between Horst Siegl and Ivan Mráz with 14 goals each.

Key

 Pld = Games played
 W = Games won
 D = Games drawn
 L = Games lost
 GF = Goals for
 GA = Goals against
 GD = Goal difference
 (a.e.t.) = Match determined after extra time
 (a) = Match determined by away goals rule
 pen. = Match determined by penalty shoot-out

 QF = Quarter-finals
 Group = Group stage
 Group 2 = Second group stage
 PO = Play-off round
 KRPO = Knockout round play-offs
 R3 = Round 3
 R2 = Round 2
 R1 = Round 1
 Q3 = Third qualification round
 Q2 = Second qualification round
 Q1 = First qualification round
 Q = Qualification round

All-time statistics
The following is a list of the all-time statistics from Sparta Prague's games in the three UEFA tournaments it has participated in, as well as the overall total. The list contains the tournament, the number of games played (Pld), won (W), drawn (D) and lost (L), as well as goals for (GF), goals against (GA) and goal difference (GD). The statistics are up to date as of 28 July 2022.

Matches 
The following is a complete list of matches played by Sparta in UEFA tournaments. It includes the season, tournament, the stage, the opponent club and its country, the date, the venue and the score, with Sparta's score noted first. It is up to date as of 21 July 2022.

References

Europe
Prague, Sparta